Peveril may refer to:

People 
 Peveril William-Powlett (1898–1985), Royal Navy officer who went on to be Commander-in-Chief, South Atlantic Station
 Peveril Meigs (1903–1979), American geographer, notable for his studies of arid lands on several continents

Fiction 
 Peveril of the Peak, the longest novel by the author Sir Walter Scott

Places 
 Peveril Castle, a ruined early medieval castle overlooking the village of Castleton in the English county of Derbyshire
 Peveril Point, a promontory and part of the town of Swanage in Dorset, England
 Peveril (Greenland), a peak in the Stauning Alps
 Peveril Bilateral School, former name of Nottingham Girls' Academy, a secondary school and sixth form with academy status
 Peveril, a hamlet within the municipality of Sainte-Justine-de-Newton, Quebec, Canada

Ships 
The Isle of Man Steam Packet Company named four of its ships Peveril.  All operated on the Irish Sea.
  A 595-ton, twin-screw Packet Steamer. She sank following a collision with SS Monarch in 1899.
  A 798-ton, cargo ship  which was sold and scrapped in 1964
  A 1,048-ton, motor cargo vessel, which was sold in 1981 and scrapped in 2001.
  A 1,950-ton, ro-ro cargo ferry, which was sold in 2000 and scrapped in 2009.

Locomotives 
 No. 6 Peveril A 2-4-0 locomotive, built by Beyer-Peacock, Gorton, Manchester, in 1875 for service with the Isle of Man Railway

See also 
 Club Sandwich at the Peveril Hotel, final release by the group Six by Seven